The Gilbreth Medal is a former management award (1931–2002) for outstanding contributions to Industrial Engineering, established in 1931 by the Society of Industrial Engineers in honor of Frank Bunker Gilbreth Sr.

Award winners 
The award winners are'': 

 1931 Dr. Lilian Gilbreth, Ph.D.
 1933 President Herbert Hoover
 1936 Ordway Tead
 1937 Allan H. Mogensen
 1938 Erwin Schell
 1939 Joseph Wickham Roe
 1940 David B. Porter
 1941 Ralph Mosser Barnes
 1942 Glenn L. Gardiner
 1943 Elmer William Engstrom
 1944 John A. Aldridge
 1945 James Secor Perkins
 1946 Harold Bright Maynard
 1947 Don F. Copell
 1948 Anne G. Shaw
 1949 James Keith Louden
 1950 Phil Carroll  
 1951 Ralph Presgrave
 1952 William R. Mullee
 1953 Marvin Everett Mundel
 1954 Craig Lee Taylor
 1955 Gustave J. Stegemerten
 1956 Herbert F. Goodwin
 1957 Harold G. Dunlap
 1958 John L. Schwab (1892–1970)
 1959 Gerald B. Bailey
 1960 Leo M. Moore
 1961 Gerald Nadler
 1962 Richard Muther
 1963 Lee Whitson
 1964 Oliver. J. Sizelove
 1965 Robert T. Livingston
 1966 Daniel M. Braum
 1968 Lucien A. Brouha
 1969 Erwin Rudolph Tichauer
 1971 Joseph H. Quick
 1972 Henry Viscardi, Jr.
 1973 Richard M. Paget
 1977 Arthur Spinanger
 1981 Joseph M. Juran
 1982 Mavin Mundel
 1989 Wallace James Richardson
 1991 Alan Pritsker
 1996 Ernestine Gilbreth Carey
 2001 David S. Ferguson 
 2002 Mary Ann Hainthaler

References 

Awards established in 1931
Management awards